"Bring It On" is a song by American rapper YoungBoy Never Broke Again, released on January 21, 2022, as the second track from his seventeenth mixtape, Colors. The song features a murderous essence that YoungBoy brings as he raps about murder, firearms, and crime.

Composition
In "Bring It On," YoungBoy interpolates his April 2020 "Step on Shit." In the song's bridge following the first verse, YoungBoy also interpolates the 1881 poem, "Ring a Ring o' Roses" as he raps: "Ring around the rosie/Pussy tryna dome me/Know the police on me/They know that they can't clone me/Shawty say she want me/Know that I got money/Say that they don't like me/'Cause I'm always stuntin'."

Critical reception
Pitchforks Paul A. Thompson noted that the mixtape "opens with a predictably furious suite" and notes that the song "culminates with closing ad-libs." Anthony Malone from HipHopDX writes that on the song, YoungBoy "[tauntes] his enemies, reveling in the fact they want him dead."

Music video
The FlyGuyNick-directed music video was released on January 21, 2022, alongside the official audio. The video sees YoungBoy smoking and dancing with loads of money inside his house with his close friend Herm Tha Blacksheep.

Personnel
Credits and personnel adapted from Tidal.

Musicians
 Jason Michael Goldberg – composer, songwriter
 Aaron Hill – production, composer, songwriter
 Daniel Lebrun – production, composer, songwriter
 Seth Love – production, composer, songwriter
 Kentrell DeSean Gaulden – lead artist, songwriter, composer

Technical
 Cheese – mastering engineer
 Cheese – mixing engineer
 Cheese – recording engineer

Charts

References

2022 songs
YoungBoy Never Broke Again songs
Songs written by YoungBoy Never Broke Again